Senator Dahl or Dahle may refer to:

Clarence P. Dahl (1892–1976), North Dakota State Senate
Gary G. Dahl (born 1940), Illinois State Senate
Brian Dahle (born 1965), California State Senate
Kevin Dahle (born 1960), Minnesota State Senate